A knockout moss is one kind of genetically modified moss, which are GM plants. One or more of the moss's specific genes are deleted or inactivated ("knocked out"), for example by gene targeting or other methods. After the deletion of a gene, the knockout moss has lost the trait encoded by this gene. Thus, the function of this gene can be inferred. This scientific approach is called reverse genetics as the scientist wants to unravel the function of a specific gene. In classical genetics the scientist starts with a phenotype of interest and searches for the gene that causes this phenotype. Knockout mosses are relevant for basic research in biology as well as in biotechnology.

Scientific background
The targeted deletion or alteration of genes relies on the integration of a DNA strand at a specific and predictable position into the genome of the host cell. This DNA strand must be engineered in such a way that both ends are identical to this specific gene locus. This is a prerequisite for being efficiently integrated via homologous recombination (HR). Basically, a knockout mouse is engineered in the same way.
So far, this method of gene targeting in land plants has been carried out in the mosses Physcomitrella patens and Ceratodon purpureus, since in these non-seed plant species the efficiency of HR is several orders of magnitude higher than in seed plants.

Knockout mosses are stored at and distributed by a specialized biobank, the International Moss Stock Center.

Method
For altering moss genes in a targeted way, the DNA-construct needs to be incubated together with moss protoplasts and with polyethylene glycol (PEG). As mosses are haploid organisms, the regenerating moss filaments (protonemata) can be directly assayed for gene targeting within 6 weeks when utilizing PCR-methods.

Examples

Chloroplast division
The first scientific publication about identification of the function of a hitherto unknown gene utilizing knockout moss appeared 1998 and was authored by Ralf Reski and coworkers. They deleted the ftsZ-gene and thus functionally identified the first gene pivotal for the division of an organelle in any eukaryote.

Protein modifications
By multiple gene knockout Physcomitrella plants were engineered, that lack the plant-specific glycosylation of proteins, an important post-translational modification. These knockout mosses are used to produce complex biopharmaceuticals in the field of molecular farming.

Mutant collection
In cooperation with the chemical company BASF Ralf Reski and coworkers established a collection of knockout mosses that is used for gene identification.

References

Molecular biology
Genetic engineering
Biological engineering
Genetically modified organisms
Molecular biology techniques
Plant genetics
Molecular genetics
Biotechnology